Diego Martín Cocca (born 11 February 1972) is an Argentine professional football manager and former player. He is the head coach of the Mexico national football team.

Playing career

Club
Cocca started his career with River Plate in 1990. He was part of the squad that won the Apertura 1991 title. Subsequently, the defender had spells with Deportivo Español and Ferro Carril Oeste in the Argentine Primera División, before joining UE Lleida in Spain for the 1996–97 season.

Cocca returned to Argentina in 1997 to play for Argentinos Juniors. In 1999, he went to Mexico to play for Atlas.

In his later career he had two spells with Banfield, and played for Veracruz and Querétaro in Mexico. He then returned to Argentinos Juniors in 2005. In 2006, he retired at the age of 34.

International
In 1991 Cocca was selected to join the Argentina U20 team to play in the 1991 FIFA World Youth Championship.

Managerial career
Cocca took his first step into management by taking over at Comisión de Actividades Infantiles in the Argentine second division. On 29 October 2008, he took over managerial duties at first division team Godoy Cruz, after then-coach Daniel Oldrá stepped down to return to the club's youth divisions. On 3 November 2009, Cocca left Godoy Cruz.

On 23 December 2009, Gimnasia y Esgrima La Plata hired Cocca as its coach on a one-year deal. The former defender helped Gimnasia avoid relegation from the first division during the 2009–10 season, after defeating Atlético de Rafaela in the relegation playoff. However, Cocca resigned from his managerial duties after the 8th fixture of the 2010–11 season, due to the team's bad results during the start of the season.

Cocca on 21 February 2011 was named manager of Mexican side Santos Laguna after coach Ruben Omar Romano was fired for making an insulting gesture to Santos fans after a defeat against Querétaro F.C.

On 4 September 2011, Cocca was sacked from his job as Santos Laguna manager after a series of defeats.

As manager of Atlas, he won the Mexican championship with the club in Apertura 2021, their first title since 1951, and again in the Clausura 2022 season.

On 10 February 2023, Cocca was named manager of Mexico, one day after stepping down as Tigres UANL manager.

Managerial statistics

Honours

Player
River Plate
Primera División Argentina: Apertura 1991

Manager
Racing
Primera División: 2014 Transición

Atlas
Liga MX: Apertura 2021, Clausura 2022
Campeón de Campeones: 2022
Individual
Liga MX Best Manager: 2021–22
Liga MX All-Star: 2022

References

External links

1972 births
Living people
Footballers from Buenos Aires
Argentine footballers
Argentina under-20 international footballers
Argentina youth international footballers
Association football defenders
Club Atlético River Plate footballers
Deportivo Español footballers
Ferro Carril Oeste footballers
UE Lleida players
Argentinos Juniors footballers
Atlas F.C. footballers
Club Atlético Banfield footballers
C.D. Veracruz footballers
Argentine Primera División players
Liga MX players
Argentine expatriate footballers
Argentine expatriate sportspeople in Spain
Expatriate footballers in Mexico
Argentine football managers
Comisión de Actividades Infantiles managers
Godoy Cruz Antonio Tomba managers
Club de Gimnasia y Esgrima La Plata managers
Santos Laguna managers
Club Atlético Huracán managers
Defensa y Justicia managers
Mexico national football team managers
Racing Club de Avellaneda managers
Querétaro F.C. footballers
Liga MX managers
Argentine expatriate football managers